INKA refers to:

Inka (drink), a Polish drink
Industri Kereta Api (INKA), an Indonesian rolling stock manufacturer

See also
Inca (disambiguation)